Kotwali Thana administrative jurisdiction in Bangladesh can refer to:

 Kotwali Thana (Dhaka)
 Kotwali Thana (Barisal)
 Kotwali Thana (Sylhet)
 Kotwali Thana (Chittagong)
 Kotwali Thana (Khulna)
 Kotwali Thana (Faridpur)